Bartosz Guzdek (born 28 July 2002) is a Polish professional footballer who plays as a forward for Odra Opole, on loan from Widzew Łódź.

Career statistics

Club

References

External links

2002 births
Living people
People from Wadowice
Polish footballers
Association football forwards
Ruch Chorzów players
Widzew Łódź players
Odra Opole players
III liga players
I liga players
Poland youth international footballers